Isa Demir (born 10 August 1985) is a Swedish footballer of Assyrian descent who plays as a right back for Assyriska United IK.

References

External links
 
 
 
 
 

1985 births
Living people
Swedish people of Assyrian/Syriac descent
Turkish people of Assyrian descent
Assyrian footballers
Swedish footballers
Association football defenders
IFK Värnamo players
Syrianska FC players
Boluspor footballers
Assyriska FF players
Allsvenskan players
Superettan players
AFC Eskilstuna players
TFF First League players
People from Södertälje
Sportspeople from Stockholm County